Statistics of Nemzeti Bajnokság I for the 1903 season.

Overview
It was contested by 8 teams, and Ferencvárosi TC won the championship.

League standings

Results

References
Hungary - List of final tables (RSSSF)

Nemzeti Bajnokság I seasons
1903 in Hungarian football
Hun
Hun